Niels Lootsma (born 15 August 1994) is a Dutch tennis player.

Lootsma has a career high ATP singles ranking of 436 achieved on 6 February 2017. He also has a career high ATP doubles ranking of 252 achieved on 23 November 2015.

Lootsma made his ATP main draw debut at the 2017 ABN AMRO World Tennis Tournament in the doubles draw partnering Tallon Griekspoor.

External links

1994 births
Living people
Dutch male tennis players
Sportspeople from Groningen (city)
20th-century Dutch people
21st-century Dutch people